John Savage may refer to:

Arts and entertainment
 John Savage (engraver) (fl. 1690–1700), printseller in London
 John Savage (author) (1673–1747), English clergyman and scholar
 John Savage (Fenian) (1828–1888), poet, journalist and author
 John Savage (actor) (born 1949), actor
 John the Savage, a character in the novel Brave New World
 John Savage, central character in the novel The Meadows of the Moon by James Hilton
 Jon Savage (born 1953), writer, broadcaster and music journalist

Military
 Sir John Savage (soldier) (1444–1492), knight and military commander
 John Savage (died 1586), soldier and co-conspirator in the 1586 Babington Plot to assassinate Elizabeth I of England
 Sit John Boscawen Savage (1760–1843), Royal Marines officer served as head of the Royal Marines

Politics
 John Savage, 2nd Earl Rivers (1603–1654), royalist and nobleman from Cheshire
 John Savage (American politician, born 1779) (1779–1863), Congressman from New York
 John Savage (Irish politician) (1814–1883), mayor of Belfast, Ireland (now Northern Ireland)
 John Houston Savage (1815–1904), Congressman from Tennessee
 John S. Savage (1841–1884), Congressman from Ohio
 John J. Savage (1910–1973), American politician, Florida House of Representatives
 John Savage (Nova Scotia politician) (1932–2003), doctor and Premier of Nova Scotia
 John Savage (British Columbia politician) (born 1936), Member of the Legislative Assembly of British Columbia

Science
 John Savage (surveyor), 18th century surveyor for Thomas Fairfax, 6th Lord Fairfax of Cameron
 John L. Savage (1879–1967), American civil engineer and United States Bureau of Reclamation design chief
 John E. Savage, computer scientist and Brown University professor

Sports
 John Savage (cricketer) (1929–2008), English cricketer 
 Jack Savage (English footballer) (1929–2009), English goalkeeper
 Jack Savage (Gaelic footballer), Kerry player
 Jack Savage (born 1964), baseball player
 John Savage (baseball) (born 1965), baseball head coach
 Savage Arena, formerly John F. Savage Hall, basketball arena for University of Toledo
 John Savage, onetime ring name of John Hindley (born 1965), British retired professional wrestler

See also
 Savage (surname)